The Marriage of Luise Rohrbach (German: Die Ehe der Luise Rohrbach) is a 1917 German silent drama film directed by Rudolf Biebrach and starring Henny Porten, Emil Jannings and Ludwig Trautmann. The film was based on a novel by Emmi Elert.

Premise
A young teacher marries a factory owner, who turns out to be extremely brutal. She eventually leaves him for a kinder, gentler man.

Cast
 Henny Porten as Luise Rohrbach
 Emil Jannings as Wilhelm Rohrbach
 Ludwig Trautmann as Lawyer Rütling
 Rudolf Biebrach as Schuldirektor
 Frida Richard as Mutter des Ermordeten
 Klara Berger

References

Bibliography
 Jung, Uli & Schatzberg, Walter. Beyond Caligari: The Films of Robert Wiene. Berghahn Books, 1999.

External links
 

1917 films
Films of the German Empire
German silent feature films
German drama films
Films directed by Rudolf Biebrach
Films based on German novels
1917 drama films
German black-and-white films
Silent drama films
1910s German films